Kijewo may refer to the following places:
Kijewo, Greater Poland Voivodeship (west-central Poland)
Kijewo, Kuyavian-Pomeranian Voivodeship (north-central Poland)
Kijewo, Warmian-Masurian Voivodeship (north Poland)
Kijewo, Szczecin